This is a complete list of all 222 episodes of the 1963 to 1970 television sitcom Petticoat Junction. There were 74 episodes in black-and-white and 148 in color.

Nielsen ratings/TV schedule
During its first four years, Petticoat Junction was a major ratings success. However, with the departure of Kate following the third episode of season 6, the show's ratings declined continuously.  Another reason was the show's new time-slot, which was Saturdays at 9:30 p.m., an extremely weak airing time.

Episodes

Season 1 (1963–64)
All episodes in black-and-white

Season 2 (1964–65)
All episodes in black-and-white

Season 3 (1965–66)
All episodes from Season 3 onwards filmed in color

Season 4 (1966–67)

Season 5 (1967–68)

Season 6 (1968–69)

Season 7 (1969–70)

References

Episodes
Lists of American sitcom episodes